Kevin Michael Walker (born September 20, 1976) is an American professional baseball coach and former relief pitcher. He is currently the bullpen coach for the Boston Red Sox of Major League Baseball (MLB). He played in MLB for the San Diego Padres, San Francisco Giants, and Chicago White Sox.

Playing career
Walker attended Grand Prairie High School in Texas. He was drafted by the San Diego Padres in the sixth round of the 1995 MLB draft and made his major league debut on April 14, 2000. On March 31, 2004, Walker was claimed off waivers by the San Francisco Giants. He became a free agent after the season and signed with the Chicago White Sox on November 23, 2004. The White Sox were the final team he appeared in MLB games with.

Walker became a free agent again after the 2005 season and signed with the Texas Rangers on November 6, 2005. He became a free agent after the 2006 season and signed with the Houston Astros for 2007. A free agent yet again after the 2007 season, Walker signed with the Camden Riversharks of the independent Atlantic League on April 7, 2008, his 14th and last year as an active player.

Walker appeared in 122 MLB games during a total of six seasons with a 7–3 record and 4.76 earned run average (ERA). In 102 innings pitched, he gave up 84 hits and 63 bases on balls, with 95 strikeouts.

Post-playing career
After the 2008 season, Walker became a pitching coach in the farm system for the Boston Red Sox. He served with the Lowell Spinners (2009) Greenville Drive (2010), Salem Red Sox (2011–2014), Portland Sea Dogs (2015–2017) and Pawtucket Red Sox (2018–2019). On October 31, 2019, Walker was promoted to assistant pitching coach for the major league Red Sox. On November 20, 2020, he was promoted to bullpen coach.

Personal life
Walker and his family reside in Holtville, California.

References

External links

1976 births
Living people
Algodoneros de Guasave players
American expatriate baseball players in Mexico
Arizona League Padres players
Baseball coaches from Texas
Baseball players from Texas
Boston Red Sox coaches
Camden Riversharks players
Charlotte Knights players
Chicago White Sox players
Clinton LumberKings players
Colorado Springs Sky Sox players
Fresno Grizzlies players
Idaho Falls Braves players
Lake Elsinore Storm players
Major League Baseball pitchers
Major League Baseball pitching coaches
Minor league baseball coaches
Mobile BayBears players
Oklahoma RedHawks players
People from Irving, Texas
Portland Beavers players
Rancho Cucamonga Quakes players
San Francisco Giants players
San Diego Padres players